The Smith Richardson Foundation is a private foundation based in Westport, Connecticut that supports policy research in the realms of foreign and domestic public policy.

According to the foundation's website, its mission is "to contribute to important public debates and to address serious public policy challenges facing the United States.  The Foundation seeks to help ensure the vitality of our social, economic, and governmental institutions.  It also seeks to assist with the development of effective policies to compete internationally and to advance U.S. interests and values abroad."

History
The Smith Richardson Foundation was established in 1935 by H. Smith Richardson Sr. and his wife Grace Jones Richardson. Richardson transformed the Vicks Chemical Company, a firm created by his father, Lunsford Richardson, into one of the leading over-the-counter drug companies in the world.  In later years, Richardson-Vicks also became a major force in the market for prescription drugs as well as a wide range of consumer products.  In 1985, the Richardson family sold the company to Procter & Gamble.

In 1973, R. Randolph Richardson assumed the presidency of the Foundation.  Richardson was particularly interested in supporting free-market and pro-democratic causes.  During his tenure as president, the Foundation played an important role in supporting think tanks and scholars who were active in public policy debates over issues such as defense policy, tax policy, education reform, and regulation.  The Foundation also supported pro-democracy organizations in Central and Eastern Europe, the Soviet Union, and Central and South America.

In 1992, Peter L. Richardson, a nephew of R. Randolph Richardson, assumed the presidency of the Foundation, while Heather Higgins, the daughter of R. Randolph Richardson, became president of the Randolph Foundation.

Assets and grant making
At the end of 2013, the foundation had assets totaling $521,570,780 according to its federal tax return.  During that year, it awarded a total of 411 grants totaling $20,695,903 .

SRF has awarded grants to major think tanks and university research centers.  Some of the foundation's major grantees include the following:

American Enterprise Institute
Brookings Institution
Center for Strategic and Budgetary Assessments
Center for Strategic and International Studies
Council on Foreign Relations
Center on Irregular Warfare and Armed Groups
Freedom House
Hudson Institute
National Institute for Public Policy
Nonproliferation Policy Education Center
Paul H. Nitze School of Advanced International Studies (SAIS) at Johns Hopkins
Pepperdine University
RAND Corporation
Urban Institute
Woodrow Wilson International Center for Scholars

Trustees and officers
Trustees
 Peter L. Richardson, Chairman of the Board   
 Stuart S. Richardson, Vice Chair
 Marin J. Strmecki Sr. V.P. and Dir., Progs.
 Ross F. Hemphill, V.P. and C.F.O.
 Arvid R. Nelson *, Secy. and Gov.
 Michael Blair
 W. Winburne King, III
 Adele Richardson Ray
 Lunsford Richardson Jr.
 E. William Stetson III

References

Anti-communist organizations in the United States
Political and economic research foundations in the United States